DTDP-3-amino-3,6-dideoxy-alpha-D-galactopyranose 3-N-acetyltransferase (FdtC, dTDP-D-Fucp3N acetylase) is an enzyme with systematic name acetyl-CoA:dTDP-3-amino-3,6-dideoxy-alpha-D-galactopyranose 3-N-acetyltransferase. This enzyme catalyses the following chemical reaction

 acetyl-CoA + dTDP-3-amino-3,6-dideoxy-alpha-D-galactopyranose  CoA + dTDP-3-acetamido-3,6-dideoxy-alpha-D-galactopyranose

dTDP-3-acetamido-3,6-dideoxy-alpha-D-galactose is a component of the glycan chain of the crystalline bacterial cell surface layer protein of Aneurinibacillus thermoaerophilus.

References

External links 
 

EC 2.3.1